The Jewish People Policy Institute (JPPI; ; formerly: The Jewish People Policy Planning (JPPPI)) is a non-profit organization with the purpose of promoting and securing the Jewish people and Israel. The institute is a professional policy planning apparatus and a strategic thought process for the Jewish people in the most fundamental subjects concerning the Jewish people. The institute is served by most prominent public figures from the government, academia, the private sector in Israel and Jewish communities around the world, who constitute the think tank of this body.

The JPPI's viewpoint is all-Jewish and long term, and a cornerstone of its work is the premise that Israel is the core of the Jewish people. Its think tank examines the challenges, threats and opportunities that the Jewish people are coping with, and develops principles for policies and strategic alternatives. In addition, it may recommend on immediate steps needed to be taken in order to secure the continuity and prosperity of the Jewish people.

JPPI was founded in 2002 by the Jewish Agency for Israel, and is run as an independent body. It is headed by a board of directors that is now chaired by Dennis Ross, the special advisor for the Persian Gulf Southwest Asia in U.S. President Barack Obama's administration. Its current President is Avinoam Bar-Yosef.

External links

JPPI's official website
The Jewish Agency for Israel
JPPI related articles on The Times of Israel
Conference on the Future of the Jewish People
 Hackers attack Jewish People Policy Institute site on Jpost

References list

Centers for the study of antisemitism
Jewish Agency for Israel
Jewish studies research institutes
Think tanks based in Israel
Non-profit organizations based in Israel